Thubactis was a city founded by the Phoenicians about 3,000 years ago some 210 km east of the Libyan city of Tripoli. It was located near the present-day city of Misurata. Located on the Mediterranean Sea, it was used as a commercial station.

References

Phoenician colonies in Libya
Archaeology of Libya